The Green Memorial A.M.E. Zion Churchis a historic church at 46 Sheridan Street in Portland, Maine.  Built in 1914, it is home to Maine's oldest African-American congregation; it is named for Moses Green, an escaped slave.  The building was listed on the National Register of Historic Places in 1973.

Description and history
The Green Memorial A.M.E. Zion Church is located in Portland's eastern Munjoy Hill neighborhood, at the corner of Sheridan and Monument Streets. It is a -story masonry structure, built out of concrete blocks and finished with a rough textured exterior.  The building corners are partially quoined with smooth blocks.  First-floor windows are rectangular sash, while second-floor windows have Gothic lancet arches, and are stained glass.  The entrance is near the street corner, sheltered by an open gable-roofed wood frame vestibule; a short wood-frame tower rises through the roof above.

Portland's Abyssinian Society was founded in 1828, and originally met in the Abyssinian Meeting House, one of the nation's oldest surviving African-American churches.  A separate African-American congregation, the Fourth Abyssinian, was split off from the Second Parish Church in 1835 and merged into the Abyssinian in 1842.  This church was built for that congregation in 1914, and was described in contemporary reports as "one of the most pretentious churches for a Black congregation in New England".

See also
National Register of Historic Places listings in Portland, Maine

References

Churches in Portland, Maine
Churches on the National Register of Historic Places in Maine
African-American history of Maine
Munjoy Hill
Churches completed in 1914
National Register of Historic Places in Portland, Maine